In category theory, a weak n-category is a generalization of the notion of strict n-category where composition and identities are not strictly associative and unital, but only associative and unital up to coherent equivalence. This generalisation only becomes noticeable at dimensions two and above where weak 2-, 3- and 4-categories are typically referred to as bicategories, tricategories, and tetracategories. The subject of weak n-categories is an area of ongoing research.

History 
There is currently much work to determine what the coherence laws for weak n-categories should be. Weak n-categories have become the main object of study in higher category theory. There are basically two classes of theories: those in which the higher cells and higher compositions are realized algebraically (most remarkably Michael Batanin's theory of weak higher categories) and those in which more topological models are used (e.g. a higher category as a simplicial set satisfying some universality properties). 

In particular, several technically accessible formalisms of (infinity, 1)-categories are now known. Now the most popular such formalism centers on a notion of quasi-category, other approaches include a properly understood theory of simplicially enriched  categories and the approach via Segal categories; a class of examples of stable  can be modeled (in the case of characteristics zero) also via pretriangulated A-infinity categories of Maxim Kontsevich.

See also
 Bicategory
 Tricategory
 Tetracategory
 Infinity category
 Opetope
 Stabilization hypothesis

External links
 n-Categories – Sketch of a Definition by John Baez
 Lectures on n-Categories and Cohomology by John Baez
 Tom Leinster, Higher operads, higher categories, math.CT/0305049

 Jacob Lurie, Higher topos theory, math.CT/0608040, published version: pdf

Higher category theory